Yellow Banana is the first studio album from Hang on the Box.

Track listing

Personnel
Wang Yue – vocals
Yang Fan – guitar
Yilina – bass
Shen Jing – drums

References
Extracts on MySpace.com
Sister Benten Records Online
[ Allmusic Listing]

2001 albums
Hang on the Box albums